Ralph Hobday OBE (September 1899 – October 1975) was a British architect who worked for the Commonwealth War Graves Commission.

Career

Hobday joined the Commonwealth War Graves Commission in 1944, became Senior Architect in 1956, and retired from the Commission in 1975.

Works
His works include:

Cemeteries
 Ambon War Cemetery on Ambon Island, Indonesia
 Jakara War Cemetery in Menteng Pulo, Jakarta, Indonesia
 Shelters and entrance gates at Lyness Royal Naval Cemetery, Hoy, Orkney, Scotland

Memorials
 The Brookwood Memorial in Brookwood Cemetery, Surrey, England. Unveiled by Queen Elizabeth II in 1958, it commemorates 3,428 Commonwealth men and women who died during the Second World War and have no known grave.
A war memorial in the form of an obelisk, which was placed in 1961 by the Commonwealth War Graves Commission opposite the World War II war graves plot at Willesden Jewish Cemetery in the London Borough of Brent, England. The first national Jewish war memorial in the UK,  it is Grade II listed.

Honours
Hobday was appointed Officer in the Order of the British Empire in the 1959 Birthday Honours.

References

 1899 births
1975 deaths
20th-century British architects
Commonwealth War Graves Commission
Officers of the Order of the British Empire